The No. 208 Wireless Set was a wireless radio transceiver used by the Australian Army during the Second World War. Developed in 1941, the unit was based on the Army No. 108 Wireless Set and manufactured by AWA. There were three versions, the 208, 208* and the 208 Mark II. The 208 could be carried, but not operated, in a backpack.

References

External links
 Wireless Set No. 208, 208* and 208 Mark II

World War II Australian electronics
Military equipment of the Australian Army
Military radio systems